"Rumors" is a song by American singer and rapper Lizzo, featuring fellow American rapper Cardi B. The song was released on August 13, 2021, through Nice Life Recording and Atlantic Records, alongside a music video. The single marked Lizzo's first release in over two years, following her album Cuz I Love You (2019). The song was written by the two artists alongside Nate Mercereau, Steven Cheung, Theron Thomas, Torae Carr, and its producer Ricky Reed.

Background and release
In October 2020, American singer and rapper Lizzo announced that her fourth studio album was nearing completion, saying she had "a few more songs to write". On January 18, 2021, American singer SZA confirmed to have heard new material by the singer. She explained that Lizzo played her "the best song I ever heard in my life" and that it made her cry. On August 1, 2021, Lizzo told fans that she had an exciting post to share the next day. On August 2, she took to social media to announce the release of the single. The single was made available for pre-order in different formats. The release of the song marked Lizzo's first release in over two years, since the release of her third studio album, Cuz I Love You, on April 9, 2019.

An accompanying music video for "Rumors" was released alongside the song on August 13, 2021.

Composition
"Rumors" was written by Lizzo, Cardi B, Torae Carr, Theron Thomas, Nate Mercereau, Steven Cheung, and its producer Ricky Reed. Musically, the song is set in the key of B minor, with a tempo of 118 beats per minute. The vocals in the song span from F3 to D5.

The song features Lizzo "talking her shit over a simple piano melody. It quickly warps into anonymous, stomping future funk, complete with rubbery synth, handclaps, and electric guitar." Lyrically, it "sees Lizzo confront the 'shit on the internеt' that's clung to her since she conquered the mainstream in 2019."

Critical reception 
Rating it with five stars out of five, Nick Levine of NME stated that "Rumors" is a "brilliant return from Lizzo that combines her signature sense of fun with some well-placed spikiness." Dubbing it "half a twerk jam and half a radio jingle" that "will be a big hit", Vulture's Craig Jenkins opined that "the journey from the rote, familiar drums and bass underneath the verses to the trippy harmonies and boisterous big-band arrangements around the chorus is too slow of a build." Comparing it to "Truth Hurts", Eric Torres of Pitchfork wrote that "Rumors" "feels slapped together from different parts of Lizzo's past hits: the bellowing horns, squealing guitar solos, and endless confidence are all here. This time, though, the formula feels strained."

Accolades

Awards and nominations

Commercial performance
"Rumors" debuted at number four on the US Billboard Hot 100, becoming Lizzo's third and Cardi B's tenth top 10 single on the chart. Lizzo also achieved her third number one and Cardi B her seventh on the Hot R&B/Hip-Hop Songs chart. It debuted at number three on the Rolling Stone Top 100 moving 136,000 units, including 15 million US streams. It also became Lizzo's first entry on Billboard Global 200 and Global Excl. US, debuting at numbers 12 and 29, respectively.

Music video
The video for "Rumors", directed by Tanu Muino, references the Muses from Disney's Hercules in a set inspired by ancient Greece. The closing pose echoes the neoclassical painting Oath of the Horatii by Jacques-Louis David. During the video Lizzo and Cardi wear golden attires, togas, and Ionic column-inspired headdress, as artwork gets animated.

Credits and personnel
Credits adapted from Tidal.

 Lizzo – vocals, songwriting
 Cardi B – featured vocals, songwriting
 Ricky Reed – songwriting, production, programming, horn arrangement, bass synthesizer, keyboards
 Nate Mercereau – songwriting, co-production, guitar, keyboards
 Tele – songwriting, co-production, programming, guitar, keyboards
 Theron Thomas – songwriting
 Torae Carr – songwriting
 Donald Hayes – alto vocals, tenor vocals, baritone saxophone
 Lemar Guillary – horn arrangement, trombone, bass trombone
 Thomas Pridgen – drums
 Mike Cordone – flugelhorn, trumpet
 Victor Indrizzo – percussion
 Michelle Mancini – mastering
 Manny Marroquin – mixing
 Leslie Brathwaite – vocal mixing
 Bill Malina – engineering
 Evan LaRay – engineering
 Patrick Kehrier – assistant engineering

Charts

Weekly charts

Year-end charts

Certifications

Release history

References

2021 singles
2021 songs
Atlantic Records singles
Cardi B songs
Lizzo songs
Songs written by Lizzo
Songs written by Cardi B
Songs written by Theron Thomas
Songs written by Ricky Reed
Music videos directed by Tanu Muino
American funk songs